Jeroen Pauw (born 15 August 1960) is a Dutch journalist and television presenter.

He is known for being the lead presenter of the evening editions of RTL Nieuws from 1989–2000, as well as presenting Pauw & Witteman with Paul Witteman and his own talk show Pauw. 

In 2008, he presented the first season of the television show 5 jaar later. He presented the show each year until 2017. In 2017, he won the TV-Beeld award for the show.

In 2019, he played a role in the film XIII: De 24-uurs film van Kalvijn.

Filmography

As presenter 

 RTL Nieuws (lead presenter; 1989–2000)
 5 jaar later (2008–2017)
 Pauw & Witteman
 Pauw

As actor 

 XIII: De 24-uurs film van Kalvijn (2019)

References

External links 

1960 births
Living people
Dutch atheists
Place of birth missing (living people)
Dutch television presenters
Dutch journalists
20th-century Dutch people
21st-century Dutch people